Ranjit Khanvilkar (30 August 1960 – 8 July 1988) was an Indian cricketer who played for Karnataka and  Railways as an All-rounder. He died in a train derailment while still an active player.

Career
Khanvilkar was one of the most promising players of Indian domestic cricket. He was one of the six centurions in the final of Ranji Trophy between Delhi versus Karnataka, where Delhi chased Karnataka's total of 705 to win the trophy on first innings lead to make 707/8. In 1983 Ranji trophy final, his knock of 32 helped to gain first innings lead over Bombay helped Karnataka to win the trophy.

Death
His career was cut short when a Bangalore - Kanyakumari Island Express train derailed on the Peruman bridge over Ashtamudi Lake, near Perinadu, Kollam, Kerala, India and fell into the lake. He was one of the 105 people killed.

References

1960 births
1988 deaths
Karnataka cricketers
South Zone cricketers
Railways cricketers
Indian cricketers
People from Akola
Cricketers from Maharashtra
Railway accident deaths in India